"The One I Love (Belongs to Somebody Else)" is a popular song composed by Isham Jones with lyrics by Gus Kahn. The song was recorded by Isham Jones' Orchestra on December 21, 1923, at Brunswick Studios in New York City, and published on January 7, 1924. On January 17 in Chicago, Jones recorded another version, with Al Jolson on lead vocals. Both versions made the charts that Spring, with Jolson's peaking at number 2, and Jones' at number 5. Sophie Tucker recorded her version February 1924, released on Okeh 40054.

Other notable recordings
Bing Crosby - recorded November 14, 1946 with John Scott Trotter and His Orchestra for Decca Records.
Doris Day - recorded November 9, 1951. Included in the album  I'll See You in My Dreams (Songs from the Warner Bros. Production) (1952).
Tommy Dorsey (vocal by Jack Leonard) - this was a minor hit in 1938.
Sheena Easton - for her album No Strings (1993)
Ella Fitzgerald - recorded January 8, 1941 for Decca Records (catalog No. 3608A).
Georgia Gibbs - for the album Georgia Gibbs Sings 1957 
Gogi Grant - for the album The Helen Morgan Story (1957).
Jack Jones - for his album My Kind of Town (1965).
Steve Lawrence - included in his album Swing Softly with Me (1959).
Julie London included the song on her Julie Is Her Name, Volume II 1958 album, and her 1968 album Easy Does It. 
Seth MacFarlane covered the song on his 2015 album, No One Ever Tells You.
Dean Martin - included in the album The Dean Martin TV Show (1966)
Glenn Miller - recorded January 17, 1941 For Bluebird Records (catalog 11110).
Matt Monro - for the album Blue and Sentimental (1957).<ref>{{cite web|title=Discogs.com|url=https://www.discogs.com/Matt-Monro-With-Malcolm-Lockyer-Orchestra-Blue-And-Sentimental/master/476545|website=Discogs.com|access-date=September 12, 2017}}</ref>
Dinah Shore - for her album Dinah, Yes Indeed! (1958)
Frank Sinatra recorded the song on June 27, 1940 with the Tommy Dorsey Orchestra and this reached the USA charts, peaking at No. 11. He re-recorded it in 1959 for his No One Cares album (though the track was unreleased until 1973), and he recorded it again on his 1961 I Remember Tommy album.

Film appearances
1949 The song was featured in the b-movie "The Last Crooked Mile"
1951 The song was performed by Doris Day in the film I'll See You in My Dreams''. starring Doris Day and Danny Thomas. The film was based loosely on the lives of Gus Kahn and his wife Grace LeBoy Kahn.
1957 The Helen Morgan Story - performed by Ann Blyth (dubbed by Gogi Grant) at the nightclub.

References

Songs with music by Isham Jones
Songs with lyrics by Gus Kahn
1924 songs
Bluebird Records singles